Monoporella is a genus of bryozoans belonging to the monotypic family Monoporellidae.

The genus has cosmopolitan distribution.

Species

Species:

Monoporella aleutica 
Monoporella ashtanensis 
Monoporella bosqueti

References

Cheilostomatida
Bryozoan genera